That '70s Show was released on DVD in Regions 1, 2 & 4 by 20th Century Fox Home Entertainment at an increment of two seasons per year.

The complete series was released in Region 1 on October 14, 2008, the Canadian cost being almost double the U.S. price.

The DVDs contain various bonus features, such as the original promos for the episodes that aired on Fox on the original air date, retrospective interviews with various cast members, and commentaries by director David Trainer on selected episodes.

The first five seasons were released in four slimcases per season with one disc per slimcase, however, beginning with season six, Fox scaled back the sets to two cases with two discs in each. This was also a complaint among collectors. Other complaints of the sets were the reusage of Eric Forman's face twice on the spine and then the discontinuation of characters on the spine. Noticeably also, every set contained the season number on the spine except for season seven.

The music that featured many popular bands was predominantly removed or replaced with stock music on the DVD releases, in order to avoid paying royalties to the artists involved (unlike the actual run of a series, where studios would only have to pay royalties to the artist for that single episode, and maybe for syndication). Episodes were also often edited to remove content by cutting out lines that were deemed to be inappropriate.

Despite his brief appearance in the eighth season, Michael Kelso's image is prominently featured on both the cover and disc art for the season's DVD set, as released by 20th Century Fox. His portrayer Ashton Kutcher's name is credited with the cast which reads "and special guest star: Ashton Kutcher". The re-issue by Mill Creek Entertainment does not include Kelso's image for season eight.

On May 4, 2011, Mill Creek Entertainment announced that they had acquired the rights to re-release the series on DVD in Region 1.  They have subsequently re-released all eight seasons on DVD

On October 12, 2011, Mill Creek Entertainment announced that they were working on a Blu-ray release of season 1 and that it would be released on January 10, 2012. However, the date was pushed back to March 20. Season 2 was released on Blu-ray on October 16, 2012.  No further seasons were released due to poor sales.

On May 14, 2013, Mill Creek released That '70s Show: The Complete Series on DVD in Region 1.

On November 3, 2015, Mill Creek released That '70s Show: The Complete Series on Blu-ray.

The Mill Creek sets claim to contain the original uncut broadcast edits, with most though not all of the original music intact. However, upon closer inspection, it's revealed that they're mostly repeats of the Fox sets with the majority of the music still omitted.

In Australia, After the release of The Complete Series in 2010, Beyond Home Entertainment acquired the rights to the series and released all 8 seasons individually on December 1, 2011. Then on May 2, 2012, The Complete Collection was released. Then followed The Collector's Edition on August 6, 2014. Followed by The Collector's Set on April 20, 2016. Lastly, The Complete Series on August 1, 2018.

References

Lists of home video releases